Walker Pass (el. ) is a mountain pass by Lake Isabella in the southern Sierra Nevada.  It is located in northeastern Kern County, approximately 53 mi (85 km) ENE of Bakersfield and 10 mi (16 km) WNW of Ridgecrest. The pass provides a route between the Kern River Valley and San Joaquin Valley on the west, and the Mojave Desert on the east.

Walker Pass is a National Historic Landmark, and is under the stewardship of the Bureau of Land Management.

History
Walker Pass was charted as a route through the Sierra in 1834 by Joseph Rutherford Walker, a member of the Bonneville Expedition who learned of it from Native Americans. Walker returned through the pass in 1843, leading an immigrant wagon train into California. In 1845 the military surveying expedition of John C. Fremont used the pass.  He suggested it be named after Walker.

The Walker Pass Lodge was built nearby in the 1930s and was a well-known rest stop before burning down around 1990.

Aside from the paved road, the pass is essentially unaltered since Walker mapped it in 1834.

Description
It is the highest point on State Route 178. The pass is also the southernmost crossing along the Sierra Crest, with more southerly Tehachapi Pass traditionally marking the geographic divide between the Sierra Nevada and Tehachapi Mountains.

Between Walker Pass and Tioga Pass, several hours drive to the north, there is only one paved road for automobiles to cross over the Sierra Nevada. It runs from the northern end of Indian Wells Valley at the east, to the hydrologic pass between the Great Basin and the Pacific Ocean at the top of the Nine-Mile Canyon road, then west along the Sherman Pass Road.

Walker Pass is sometimes closed due to snowfall, but due to its lower elevation these closures are for brief periods. However, most east–west traffic in the region utilizes the four-lane State Route 58 through Tehachapi Pass, located about one hour's drive to the south.

The Pacific Crest Trail crosses at Walker Pass. A campsite situated about 0.6 miles (1 kilometer) southwest of the road pass is a popular stop for hikers and astronomers alike.

California Historical Landmark
The California Historical Landmark reads:

NO. 99 WALKER'S PASS - Discovered by Joseph R. Walker, American trailblazer, who left the San Joaquin Valley through this pass in 1834. This area was traversed by topographer Edward M. Kern, after whom the Kern River was named, while accompanying the Frémont expedition of 1845. After 1860 it became a mining freight route to Owens Valley.

See also
 List of Sierra Nevada road passes
 
 
 California Historical Landmarks in Kern County, California
 National Register of Historic Places listings in Kern County, California

References

External links
BLM management plan for Walker Pass National Historic Landmark 

Mountain passes of the Sierra Nevada (United States)
Historic trails and roads in California
Landforms of Kern County, California
Transportation in Kern County, California
History of the Mojave Desert region
History of the Sierra Nevada (United States)
Kern River Valley
Mojave Desert
California Historical Landmarks
Road transportation infrastructure on the National Register of Historic Places
National Historic Landmarks in California
National Register of Historic Places in Kern County, California
Protected areas of Kern County, California
Protected areas of the Mojave Desert
National Register of Historic Places in California